The Renfrew Fair is an annual event held in Renfrew, Ontario. The fair has been operating since 1852, when it was "organized by local Scotsmen with a government grant".

As of 1918, it was reportedly the "second largest county fair in Ontario".

Notes

External links 
 Renfrew Fair website

Culture of Renfrew County
Fairs in Ontario
Tourist attractions in Renfrew County
Recurring events established in 1852
1852 establishments in Canada